"The Over-Soul" is an essay by Ralph Waldo Emerson, first published in 1841. With the human soul as its overriding subject, several general themes are treated:  (1) the existence and nature of the human soul; (2) the relationship between the soul and the personal ego; (3) the relationship of one human soul to another; and (4) the relationship of the human soul to God.  Influence of Eastern religions, including Vedantism, is plainly evident, but the essay also develops ideas long present in the Western tradition, e.g., in the works of Plato, Plutarch, and Neoplatonists like Plotinus and Proclus – all of whose writings Emerson read extensively throughout his career – and Emanuel Swedenborg.

The essay attempts no systematic doctrine, but rather serves as a work of art, something like poetry.  Its virtue is in personal insights of the author and the lofty manner of their presentation.  Emerson wishes to exhort and direct the reader to an awakening of similar thoughts or sentiments.

With respect to the four themes listed above, the essay presents the following views:  (1) the human soul is immortal, and immensely vast and beautiful; (2) our conscious ego is slight and limited in comparison to the soul, despite the fact that we habitually mistake our ego for our true self; (3) at some level, the souls of all people are connected, though the precise manner and degree of this connection is not spelled out; and (4) the essay does not seem to explicitly contradict the traditional Western idea that the soul is created by and has an existence that is similar to God, or rather God exists within us.

The Over-Soul is now considered one of Emerson's greatest writings.

History
The essay includes the following passage:

For Emerson the term denotes a supreme underlying unity which transcends duality or plurality, much in keeping with the philosophy of Advaita Vedanta. This non-Abrahamic interpretation of Emerson's use of the term is further supported by the fact that Emerson's Journal records in 1845 suggest that he was reading the Bhagavad Gita and Henry Thomas Colebrooke's essays on the Vedas. Emerson goes on in the same essay to further articulate his view of this dichotomy between phenomenal plurality and transcendental unity:

"Over-soul" has more recently come to be used by Eastern philosophers such as Meher Baba and others as the closest English language equivalent of the Vedic concept of Paramatman.  (In Sanskrit the word param means "supreme" and atman means "soul"; thus Paramatman literally means "Supreme-Soul".)  The term is used frequently in discussion of Eastern metaphysics and has also entered western vernacular. In this context, the term "Over-soul" is understood as the collective indivisible Soul, of which all individual souls or identities are included. The experience of this underlying reality of the indivisible "I am" state of the Over-soul is said to be veiled from the human mind by sanskaras, or impressions, acquired over the course of evolution and reincarnation. Such past impressions form a kind of sheath between the Over-soul and its true identity, as they give rise to the tendency of identification with the gross differentiated body. Thus the world, as apperceived through the impressions of the past appears plural, while reality experienced in the present, unencumbered by past impressions (the unconditioned or liberated mind), perceives itself as the One indivisible totality, i.e. the Over-soul.

See also

Anima Mundi
Adi Shankara
Anaxagoras
Brahman
Collective unconscious
Global brain
God Speaks
Homecoming Saga
Jainism
Jane Roberts
Mana (Mandaeism)
Nanua Bairagi
Noosphere
Ontology
Orphism (religion)
Posidonius
Swedenborg
Vitalism

References

External links 

 Complete text of The Over-Soul online
 Emerson and Shankara at infinityfoundation.com

Conceptions of God
Mysticism texts
Occult collective consciousness
Romanticism
Essays by Ralph Waldo Emerson
1841 essays